Jehovah is a Latinization of the Hebrew  , one vocalization of the Tetragrammaton  (YHWH), the proper name of the God of Israel in the Hebrew Bible/Old Testament. The Tetragrammaton  is considered one of the seven names of God in Judaism and a form of God's name in Christianity.

The consensus among scholars is that the historical vocalization of the Tetragrammaton at the time of the redaction of the Torah (6th century BCE) is most likely Yahweh. The derived forms Iehouah and Jehovah first appeared in the 16th century.

The vocalization of the Tetragrammaton Jehovah was first introduced by William Tyndale in his translation of Exodus 6:3, and appears in some other early English translations including the Geneva Bible and the King James Version. The United States Conference of Catholic Bishops states that in order to pronounce the Tetragrammaton "it is necessary to introduce vowels that alter the written and spoken forms of the name (i.e. "Yahweh" or "Jehovah")." Jehovah appears in the Old Testament of some widely used translations including the American Standard Version (1901) and Young's Literal Translation (1862, 1899); the New World Translation (1961, 2013) uses Jehovah in both the Old and New Testaments. Jehovah does not appear in most mainstream English translations, some of which use Yahweh but most continue to use "Lord" or "" to represent the Tetragrammaton.

Pronunciation

Some hold that there is evidence that a form of the Tetragrammaton similar to Jehovah may have been in use in Semitic and Greek phonetic texts and artifacts from Late Antiquity. Others say that it is the pronunciation Yahweh that is testified in both Christian and pagan texts of the early Christian era.

Some Karaite Jews, as proponents of the rendering Jehovah, state that although the original pronunciation of  has been obscured by disuse of the spoken name according to oral Rabbinic law, well-established English transliterations of other Hebrew personal names are accepted in normal usage, such as Joshua, Jeremiah, Isaiah or Jesus, for which the original pronunciations may be unknown. They also point out that "the English form Jehovah is quite simply an Anglicized form of Yhovah," and preserves the four Hebrew consonants "YHVH" (with the introduction of the "J" sound in English). Some argue that Jehovah is preferable to Yahweh, based on their conclusion that the Tetragrammaton was likely tri-syllabic originally, and that modern forms should therefore also have three syllables.

In an article he wrote in the Journal of Biblical Literature, Biblical scholar Francis B. Dennio said: "Jehovah misrepresents Yahweh no more than Jeremiah misrepresents Yirmeyahu. The settled connotations of Isaiah and Jeremiah forbid questioning their right." Dennio argued that the form Jehovah is not a barbarism, but is the best English form available, being that it has for centuries gathered the necessary connotations and associations for valid use in English.

According to a Jewish tradition developed during the 3rd to 2nd centuries BCE, the Tetragrammaton is written but not pronounced. When read, substitute terms replace the divine name where  appears in the text. Based on this reasoning, the form  has been characterized by some as a "hybrid form", and even "a philological impossibility".

Early modern translators disregarded the practice of reading  (or its equivalents in Greek and Latin,  and ) in place of the Tetragrammaton and instead combined the four Hebrew letters of the Tetragrammaton with the vowel points that, except in synagogue scrolls, accompanied them, resulting in the form Jehovah. This form, which first took effect in works dated 1278 and 1303, was adopted in Tyndale's and some other  Protestant translations of the Bible. In the 1560 Geneva Bible, the Tetragrammaton is translated as Jehovah six times, four as the proper name, and two as place-names. In the 1611 King James Version, Jehovah occurred seven times. In the 1885 English Revised Version, the form Jehovah occurs twelve times. In the 1901 American Standard Version the form "Je-ho'vah" became the regular English rendering of the Hebrew , all throughout, in preference to the previously dominant "the ", which is generally used in the King James Version. It is also used in Christian hymns such as the 1771 hymn, "Guide Me, O Thou Great Jehovah".

Development

Taking the spellings at face value may have been as a result of not knowing about the Q're perpetuum, resulting in the transliteration Yehowah and derived variants. Emil G. Hirsch was among the modern scholars that recognized "Jehovah" to be "grammatically impossible".

The pronunciation Jehovah is believed to have arisen through the introduction of vowels of the —the marginal notation used by the Masoretes. For a few very frequent words the marginal note was omitted, referred to as q're perpetuum. One of these frequent cases was God's name, which was not to be pronounced in fear of profaning the "ineffable name". This combination produces  and  respectively.  is also written , or even , and read  ("the name").

The use of the composite  in cases where the name is to be read , has led to the opinion that the composite  ought to have been used to indicate the reading .

Introduction into English

The earliest available Latin text to use a vocalization similar to Jehovah dates from the 13th century. The Brown-Driver-Briggs Lexicon suggested that the pronunciation Jehovah was unknown until 1520 when it was introduced by Galatinus, who defended its use.

In English it appeared in William Tyndale's translation of the Pentateuch ("The Five Books of Moses") published in 1530 in Germany, where Tyndale had studied since 1524, possibly in one or more of the universities at Wittenberg, Worms and Marburg, where Hebrew was taught. The spelling used by Tyndale was "Iehouah"; at that time, "I" was not distinguished from J, and U was not distinguished from V. The original 1611 printing of the Authorized King James Version used "Iehouah". Tyndale wrote about the divine name: "IEHOUAH [Jehovah], is God's name; neither is any creature so called; and it is as much to say as, One that is of himself, and dependeth of nothing. Moreover, as oft as thou seest  in great letters (except there be any error in the printing), it is in Hebrew Iehouah, Thou that art; or, He that is." The name is also found in a 1651 edition of Ramón Martí's .

The name Jehovah (initially as Iehouah) appeared in all early Protestant Bibles in English, except Coverdale's translation in 1535. The Authorized King James Version, which used "" in a few places, most frequently gave "the " as the equivalent of the Tetragrammaton. The form Iehouah appeared in John Rogers' Matthew Bible in 1537, the Great Bible of 1539, the Geneva Bible of 1560, Bishop's Bible of 1568 and the King James Version of 1611. More recently, Jehovah has been used in the Revised Version of 1885, the American Standard Version in 1901, and the New World Translation of the Holy Scriptures of Jehovah's Witnesses in 1961.

At Exodus 6:3–6, where the King James Version has Jehovah, the Revised Standard Version (1952), the New American Standard Bible (1971), the New International Version (1978), the New King James Version (1982), the New Revised Standard Version (1989), the New Century Version (1991), and the Contemporary English Version (1995) give "" or "Lord" as their rendering of the Tetragrammaton, while the New Jerusalem Bible (1985), the Amplified Bible (1987), the New Living Translation (1996, revised 2007), and the Holman Christian Standard Bible (2004) use the form Yahweh.

Hebrew vowel points
Modern guides to Biblical Hebrew grammar, such as Duane A Garrett's A Modern Grammar for Classical Hebrew state that the Hebrew vowel points now found in printed Hebrew Bibles were invented in the second half of the first millennium AD, long after the texts were written. This is indicated in the authoritative Hebrew Grammar of Gesenius, and Godwin's Cabalistic Encyclopedia, and is acknowledged even by those who say that guides to Hebrew are perpetuating "scholarly myths".

"Jehovist" scholars, largely earlier than the 20th century, who believe  to be the original pronunciation of the divine name, argue that the Hebraic vowel-points and accents were known to writers of the scriptures in antiquity and that both Scripture and history argue in favor of their ab origine status to the Hebrew language. Some members of Karaite Judaism, such as Nehemia Gordon, hold this view. The antiquity of the vowel points and of the rendering Jehovah was defended by various scholars, including Michaelis, Drach, Stier, William Fulke (1583), Johannes Buxtorf, his son Johannes Buxtorf II, and John Owen (17th century); Peter Whitfield and John Gill (18th century), John Moncrieff (19th century), Johann Friedrich von Meyer (1832) Thomas D. Ross has given an account of the controversy on this matter in England down to 1833. G. A. Riplinger, John Hinton, Thomas M. Strouse, are more recent defenders of the authenticity of the vowel points.

Proponents of pre-Christian origin
18th-century theologian John Gill puts forward the arguments of 17th-century Johannes Buxtorf II and others in his writing, A Dissertation Concerning the Antiquity of the Hebrew Language, Letters, Vowel-Points and Accents. He argued for an extreme antiquity of their use, rejecting the idea that the vowel points were invented by the Masoretes. Gill presented writings, including passages of scripture, that he interpreted as supportive of his "Jehovist" viewpoint that the Old Testament must have included vowel-points and accents. He argued that throughout this history the Masoretes did not invent the vowel points and accents, but that they were delivered to Moses by God at Sinai, citing Karaite authorities Mordechai ben Nisan Kukizov (1699) and his associates, who stated that "all our wise men with one mouth affirm and profess that the whole law was pointed and accented, as it came out of the hands of Moses, the man of God." The argument between Karaite and Rabbinic Judaism on whether it was lawful to pronounce the name represented by the Tetragrammaton is claimed to show that some copies have always been pointed (voweled) and that some copies were not pointed with the vowels because of "oral law", for control of interpretation by some Judeo sects, including non-pointed copies in synagogues. Gill claimed that the pronunciation  can be traced back to early historical sources which indicate that vowel points and/or accents were used in their time. Sources Gill claimed supported his view include:
 The Book of Cosri and commentator Rabbi Judab Muscatus, which claim that the vowel points were taught to Adam by God.
 Saadiah Gaon (927 AD)
 Jerome (380 AD)
 Origen (250 AD)
 The Zohar (120 AD)
 Jesus Christ (31 AD), based on Gill's interpretation of Matthew 5:18
 Hillel the Elder and Shammai division (30 BC)
 Karaites (120 BCE)
 Demetrius Phalereus, librarian for Ptolemy II Philadelphus king of Egypt (277 BCE)

Gill quoted Elia Levita, who said, "There is no syllable without a point, and there is no word without an accent," as showing that the vowel points and the accents found in printed Hebrew Bibles have a dependence on each other, and so Gill attributed the same antiquity to the accents as to the vowel points. Gill acknowledged that Levita, "first asserted the vowel points were invented by "the men of Tiberias", but made reference to his condition that "if anyone could convince him that his opinion was contrary to the book of Zohar, he should be content to have it rejected." Gill then alludes to the book of Zohar, stating that rabbis declared it older than the Masoretes, and that it attests to the vowel-points and accents.

The 1602 Spanish Bible (Reina-Valera/Cipriano de Valera) used the name Iehova and gave a lengthy defense of the pronunciation Jehovah in its preface.

Proponents of later origin
Despite Jehovist claims that vowel signs are necessary for reading and understanding Hebrew, modern Hebrew (apart from young children's books, some formal poetry and Hebrew primers for new immigrants), is written without vowel points. The Torah scrolls do not include vowel points, and ancient Hebrew was written without vowel signs.

The Dead Sea Scrolls, discovered in 1946 and dated from 400 BC to 70 AD, include texts from the Torah or Pentateuch and from other parts of the Hebrew Bible, and have provided documentary evidence that, in spite of claims to the contrary, the original Hebrew texts were in fact written without vowel points. Menahem Mansoor's The Dead Sea Scrolls: A College Textbook and a Study Guide claims the vowel points found in printed Hebrew Bibles were devised in the 9th and 10th centuries.

Gill's view that the Hebrew vowel points were in use at the time of Ezra or even since the origin of the Hebrew language is stated in an early 19th-century study in opposition to "the opinion of most learned men in modern times", according to whom the vowel points had been "invented since the time of Christ". The study presented the following considerations:
 The argument that vowel points are necessary for learning to read Hebrew is refuted by the fact that the Samaritan text of the Bible is read without them and that several other Semitic languages, kindred to Hebrew, are written without any indications of the vowels.
 The books used in synagogue worship have always been without vowel points, which, unlike the letters, have thus never been treated as sacred.
 The Qere Kethib marginal notes give variant readings only of the letters, never of the points, an indication either that these were added later or that, if they already existed, they were seen as not so important.
 The Kabbalists drew their mysteries only from the letters and completely disregarded the points, if there were any.
 In several cases, ancient translations from the Hebrew Bible (Septuagint, Targum, Aquila of Sinope, Symmachus, Theodotion, Jerome) read the letters with vowels different from those indicated by the points, an indication that the texts from which they were translating were without points. The same holds for Origen's transliteration of the Hebrew text into Greek letters. Jerome expressly speaks of a word in Habakkuk 3:5, which in the present Masoretic Text has three consonant letters and two vowel points, as being of three letters and no vowel whatever.
 Neither the Jerusalem Talmud nor the Babylonian Talmud (in all their recounting of Rabbinical disputes about the meaning of words), nor Philo nor Josephus, nor any Christian writer for several centuries after Christ make any reference to vowel points.

Early modern arguments

In the 16th and 17th centuries, various arguments were presented for and against the transcription of the form Jehovah.

Discourses rejecting Jehovah

Discourses defending Jehovah

Summary of discourses
William Robertson Smith summarizes these discourses, concluding that "whatever, therefore, be the true pronunciation of the word, there can be little doubt that it is not Jehovah". Despite this, he consistently uses the name Jehovah throughout his dictionary and when translating Hebrew names. Some examples include Isaiah [Jehovah's help or salvation], Jehoshua [Jehovah a helper], Jehu [Jehovah is He].

Usage in English Bible translations 
The following versions of the Bible render the Tetragrammaton as Jehovah either exclusively or in selected verses:

 William Tyndale, in his 1530 translation of the first five books of the English Bible, at Exodus 6:3 renders the divine name as Iehovah. In his foreword to this edition he wrote: "Iehovah is God's name... Moreover, as oft as thou seeist  in great letters (except there be any error in the printing) it is in Hebrew Iehovah."
 The Great Bible (1539) renders Jehovah in Psalm 33:12 and Psalm 83:18.
 In the Bishop's Bible (1568), the word Jehovah occurs in Exodus 6:3 and Psalm 83:18.
 The Authorized King James Version (1611) renders  in Exodus 6:3, Psalm 83:18, Isaiah 12:2, Isaiah 26:4, and three times in compound place names at Genesis 22:14, Exodus 17:15 and Judges 6:24.
 Webster's Bible Translation (1833) by Noah Webster, a revision of the King James Bible, contains the form Jehovah in all cases where it appears in the original King James Version, as well as another seven times in Isaiah 51:21, Jeremiah 16:21; 23:6; 32:18; 33:16, Amos 5:8 and Micah 4:13.

 The King James Bible (1853) in e.g. Genesis 12:14, Exodus 6:3, Judges 6:24, Isaiah 12:2 (see image), Isaiah 26:3 and Psalms 83:18.
 Young's Literal Translation by Robert Young (1862, 1898) renders the Tetragrammaton as Jehovah 6,831 times.
 The Julia E. Smith Parker Translation (1876) considered the first complete translation of the Bible into English by a woman. This Bible version was titled The Holy Bible: Containing the Old and New Testaments; Translated Literally from the Original Tongues. This translation prominently renders the Tetragrammaton as Jehovah throughout the entire Old Testament.
 The English Revised Version (1881-1885, published with the Apocrypha in 1894) renders the Tetragrammaton as  where it appears in the King James Version, and another eight times in Exodus 6:2,6–8, Psalm 68:20, Isaiah 49:14, Jeremiah 16:21 and Habakkuk 3:19.
 The Darby Bible (1890) by John Nelson Darby renders the Tetragrammaton as Jehovah 6,810 times.
 The American Standard Version (1901) renders the Tetragrammaton as Je-ho’vah in 6,823 places in the Old Testament.(Note: The Watchtower Edition of the ASV renders Jehovah in 6,870 places in the Old Testament, 47 more times than in mainstream editions.)
 The Modern Reader's Bible (1914) an annotated reference study Bible based on the English Revised Version of 1894 by Richard Moulton, renders Jehovah where it appears in the English Revised Version of 1894.
 The Holy Scriptures (1936, 1951), Hebrew Publishing Company, revised by Alexander Harkavy, a Hebrew Bible translation in English, contains the form Jehovah where it appears in the King James Version except in Isaiah 26:4.
 The Modern Language Bible—The New Berkeley Version in Modern English (1969) renders Jehovah in Genesis 22:14, Exodus 3:15, Exodus 6:3 and Isaiah 12:2. This translation was a revision of an earlier translation by Gerrit Verkuyl.
 The New English Bible (1970) published by Oxford University Press uses  in Exodus 3:15-16 and 6:3, and in four place names at Genesis 22:14, Exodus 17:15, Judges 6:24 and Ezekiel 48:35. A total of 7 times.
 The King James II Version (1971) by Jay P. Green, Sr., published by Associated Publishers and Authors, renders Jehovah at Psalms 68:4 in addition to where it appears in the Authorized King James Version, a total of 8 times.
 The Living Bible (1971) by Kenneth N. Taylor, published by Tyndale House Publishers, Illinois, Jehovah appears 428 times according to the Living Bible Concordance by Jack Atkeson Speer and published by Poolesville Presbyterian Church; 2nd edition (1973).
 The Bible in Living English (1972) by Steven T. Byington, published by the Watchtower Bible and Tract Society, renders the name Jehovah throughout the Old Testament over 6,800 times.
 Green's Literal Translation (1985) by Jay P. Green, published by Sovereign Grace Publishers, renders the Tetragrammaton as Jehovah 6,866 times.
 The 21st Century King James Version (1994), published by Deuel Enterprises, Inc., renders Jehovah at Psalms 68:4 in addition to where it appears in the Authorized King James Version, a total of 8 times. A revision including the Apocrypha entitled the Third Millennium Bible (1998) also renders Jehovah in the same verses.
 The American King James Version (1999) by Michael Engelbrite renders Jehovah in all the places where it appears in the Authorized King James Version.
 The Recovery Version (1999, 2003, 2016) renders the Tetragrammaton as Jehovah throughout the Old Testament 6,841 times.
 The New Heart English Translation (Jehovah Edition) (2010) [a Public Domain work with no copyright] uses "Jehovah" 6837 times.

Bible translations with the divine name in the New Testament:

 In the Emphatic Diaglott (1864) a Greek-English Interlinear translation of the New Testament by Benjamin Wilson, the name Jehovah appears eighteen times.
 The Five Pauline Epistles, A New Translation (1900) by William Gunion Rutherford uses the name Jehovah six times in the Book of Romans.

Bible translations with the divine name in both the Old Testament and the New Testament:
render the Tetragrammaton as Jehovah either exclusively or in selected verses:

 In the New World Translation of the Holy Scriptures (1961, 1984, 2013) published by the Watchtower Bible and Tract Society, Jehovah appears 7,199 times in the 1961 edition, 7,210 times in the 1984 revision and 7,216 times in the 2013 revision, comprising 6,979 instances in the Old Testament, and 237 in the New Testament—including 70 of the 78 times where the New Testament quotes an Old Testament passage containing the Tetragrammaton, where the Tetragrammaton does not appear in any extant Greek manuscript.
 The Original Aramaic Bible in Plain English (2010) by David Bauscher, a self-published English translation of the New Testament, from the Aramaic of The Peshitta New Testament with a translation of the ancient Aramaic Peshitta version of Psalms & Proverbs, contains the word "JEHOVAH" approximately 239 times in the New Testament, where the Peshitta itself does not. In addition, "Jehovah" also appears 695 times in the Psalms and 87 times in Proverbs, totaling 1,021 instances.
 The Divine Name King James Bible (2011) - Uses JEHOVAH 6,973 times throughout the OT, and LORD with Jehovah in parentheses 128 times in the NT.

Non-usage
The Douay Version of 1609 renders the phrase in Exodus 6:3 as "and my name Adonai", and in its footnote says: "Adonai is not the name here vttered to Moyses but is redde in place of the vnknowen name". The Challoner revision (1750) uses ADONAI with a note stating, "some moderns have framed the name Jehovah, unknown to all the ancients, whether Jews or Christians."

Various Messianic Jewish Bible translations use Adonai (Complete Jewish Bible (1998), Tree of Life Version (2014) or Hashem (Orthodox Jewish Bible (2002)).

A few sacred name Bibles use the Tetragrammaton instead of a generic title (e.g., the LORD) or a conjectural transliteration (e.g., Yahweh or Jehovah):
 The Scriptures (ISR) Version (1993, 1998, 2009)
 Sacred Name King James Bible (2005).
 HalleluYah Scriptures (2009, 2015).
 Literal English Version (2014)

 The Revised Standard Version (1952), an authorized revision of the American Standard Version of 1901, replaced all 6,823 usages of Jehovah in the 1901 text with "" or "", depending on whether the Hebrew of the verse in question is read "Adonai" or "Elohim" in Jewish practice. A footnote on Exodus 3:15 says: "The word  when spelled with capital letters, stands for the divine name, YHWH." The preface states: "The word 'Jehovah' does not accurately represent any form of the name ever used in Hebrew".
 The New American Bible (1970, revised 1986, 1991). Its footnote to Genesis 4:25–26 says: "... men began to call God by his personal name, Yahweh, rendered as "the " in this version of the Bible."
 The New American Standard Bible (1971, updated 1995), another revision of the 1901 American Standard Version, followed the example of the Revised Standard Version. In its preface it says: "It is known that for many years YHWH has been transliterated as Yahweh, however no complete certainty attaches to this pronunciation."
 The Bible in Today's English (Good News Bible), published by the American Bible Society (1976). Its preface states: "the distinctive Hebrew name for God (usually transliterated Jehovah or Yahweh) is in this translation represented by 'The Lord'." A footnote to  states: "I am sounds like the Hebrew name Yahweh traditionally transliterated as Jehovah."
 The New International Version (1978, revised 2011).
 The New King James Version (1982), though based on the King James Version, replaces JEHOVAH wherever it appears in the Authorized King James Version with "", and adds a note: "Hebrew YHWH, traditionally Jehovah", except at Psalms 68:4, Isaiah 12:2, Isaiah 26:4 and Isaiah 38:11 where the tetragrammaton is rendered "Yah".
 The God's Word Translation (1985).
 The New Revised Standard Version (1990), a revision of the Revised Standard Version uses "LORD" and "GOD" exclusively.
 The New Century Version (1987, revised 1991).
 The New International Reader's Version (1995).
 The Contemporary English Version or CEV (also known as Bible for Today's Family) (1995).
 The English Standard Version (2001).
 The Common English Bible  (2011).
 The Modern English Version (2014).

A few translations use titles such as The Eternal:
 Moffatt, New Translation (1922)
 The Voice (2012)

Some translations use both Yahweh and :
 The Bible, An American Translation (1939) by J.M. Powis Smith and Edgar J. Goodspeed. Generally uses "" but uses Yahweh and/or "Yah" exactly where  Jehovah  appears in the King James Version except in Psalms 83:18, "Yahweh" also appears in Exodus 3:15.
 The Amplified Bible (1965, revised 1987) generally uses Lord, but translates  as: "I appeared to Abraham, to Isaac, and to Jacob as God Almighty [El-Shaddai], but by My name the Lord [Yahweh—the redemptive name of God] I did not make Myself known to them [in acts and great miracles]."
 The Holman Christian Standard Bible (2004, revised 2008) mainly uses , but in its second edition increased the number of times it uses Yahweh from 78 to 495 (in 451 verses).

Some translate the Tetragrammaton exclusively as Yahweh:
 Rotherham's Emphasized Bible (1902) retains "Yahweh" throughout the Old Testament.
 The Jerusalem Bible (1966).
 The New Jerusalem Bible (1985).
 The Christian Community Bible (1988) is a translation of the Christian Bible in the English language originally produced in the Philippines and uses "Yahweh".
 The World English Bible (1997) is based on the 1901 American Standard Version, but uses "Yahweh" instead of "Jehovah".
 Hebraic Roots Bible (2009, 2012)
 The Lexham English Bible (2011) uses "Yahweh" in the Old Testament.
 Names of God Bible (2011, 2014), edited by Ann Spangler and published by Baker Publishing Group. The core text of the 2011 edition uses the God's Word translation. The core text of the 2014 edition uses the King James Version, and includes Jehovah next to Yahweh where "LORD Jehovah" appears in the source text. The print edition of both versions have divine names printed in brown and includes a commentary. Both editions use "Yahweh" in the Old Testament.
 The Sacred Scriptures Bethel Edition (1981) is a Sacred Name Bible which uses the name "Yahweh" in both the Old and New Testaments (Chamberlin p. 51-3). It was produced by the Assemblies of Yahweh elder, the late Jacob O. Meyer, based on the American Standard Version of 1901.

Other usage

Following the Middle Ages, before and after the Protestant Reformation, some churches and public buildings across Europe were decorated with variants and cognates of "Jehovah".

Lyrics of some Christian hymns, for example, "Guide me, O thou great Jehovah", include "Jehovah". The form also appears in some reference books and novels, appearing several times in the novel The Greatest Story Ever Told, by Catholic author Fulton Oursler.

Some religious groups, notably Jehovah's Witnesses and proponents of the King-James-Only movement, continue to use Jehovah as the only name of God. In Mormonism, "Jehovah" is thought to be the name by which Jesus was known prior to his birth; references to "the " in the KJV Old Testament are therefore understood to be references to the pre-mortal Jesus, whereas God the Father, who is regarded as a separate individual, is sometimes referred to as "Elohim". "Jehovah" is twice rendered in the Book of Mormon, in 2 Nephi 22:2 and Moroni 10:34.

Similar Greek names

Ancient
 : Pistis Sophia cited by Charles William King, which also gives  ((2nd century)
 : Pistis Sophia (2nd century)
 , the seven vowels of the Greek alphabet arranged in this order. Charles William King attributes to a work that he calls On Interpretations the statement that this was the Egyptian name of the supreme God. He comments: "This is in fact a very correct representation, if we give each vowel its true Greek sound, of the Hebrew pronunciation of the word Jehovah." (2nd century)
 : Eusebius, who says that Sanchuniathon received the records of the Jews from Hierombalus, priest of the god Ieuo. (c. 315)
 : Hellenistic magical text (2nd–3rd centuries), M. Kyriakakes (2000)

Modern
  (like Jehova[h]): Paolo Medici (1755)
  (like Je[h]ova[h]): Greek Pentateuch (1833), Holy Bible translated in Katharevousa Greek by Neophytus Vamvas (1850)
  (like Jehova[h]): Panagiotes Trempelas (1958)

Similar Latin and English transcriptions

Transcriptions of  similar to Jehovah occurred as early as the 12th century.
 Ieve: Petrus Alphonsi (c. 1106), Alexander Geddes (1800)
 Jehova: Raymond Martin (Raymundus Martini) (1278), Porchetus de Salvaticis (1303), Tremellius (1575), Marcus Marinus (1593), Charles IX of Sweden (1606), Rosenmüller (1820), Wilhelm Gesenius (c. 1830)
 Yohoua: Raymond Martin (1278)
 Yohouah: Porchetus de Salvaticis (1303)
 Ieoa: Nicholas of Cusa (1428)
 Iehoua: Nicholas of Cusa (1428), Peter Galatin (Galatinus) (1516)
 Iehova: Nicholas of Cusa (1428), Jacques Lefèvre d'Étaples (1514), Sebastian Münster (1526), Leo Jud (1543), Robert Estienne (1557)
 Ihehoua: Nicholas of Cusa (1428)
 Jova: 16th century, Rosenmüller (1820)
 Jehovah: Paul Fagius (1546), John Calvin (1557), King James Bible (1671 [OT] / 1669 [NT]), Matthew Poole (1676), Benjamin Kennicott (1753), Alexander Geddes (1800)
 Iehouáh: Geneva Bible (1560)
 Iehovah: Authorized King James Version (1611), Henry Ainsworth (1627)
 Jovae: Rosenmüller (1820)
 Yehovah: William Baillie (1843)
 Jahovah: Sebastian Schmidt (1872), Samuel Hammond (1899)

See also
 Allah
 Ea
 El
 Enlil
 God in Christianity, God in Islam, God in Mormonism, God in the Bahá'í Faith
 I am that I am
 Jah
 Names of God
 Theophoric name
 Yam (Ya'a, Yaw)

Footnotes

Notes

External links

 
 
 
 
 "Tetragrammaton", Jewish Encyclopedia 1906

16th-century neologisms
Deities in the Hebrew Bible
Christianity and Judaism related controversies
Names of God in Christianity
Names of God in Judaism
Reconstructed words
Tetragrammaton
Yahweh

ja:ヤハウェ (ヘブライ語)